Frank M. Wozencraft (1924-1994) was from 1966 to 1969 the Assistant Attorney General in charge of the Office of Legal Counsel in the United States justice department.

Wozencraft was educated at Williams College and Yale Law School receiving his law degree from the latter in 1949. He was a clerk for Justice Hugo Black of the United States Supreme Court.

In 1950 he joined the law firm of Baker and Botts in Houston. He specialized in business law and remained with this firm his entire career except while he was an assistant attorney general.

Sources
New York Times obituary for Wolzencraft

1924 births
Williams College alumni
Yale Law School alumni
Texas lawyers
1994 deaths
People associated with Baker Botts
20th-century American lawyers